Nurbolat Kulimbetov (born 9 May 1992) is a Kazakh former professional cyclist.

Major results

2012
 1st Stage 5 Heydar Aliyev Anniversary Tour
2013
 2nd  Road race, Asian Under-23 Road Championships
2014
 Vuelta a la Independencia Nacional
1st Points classification
1st Stage 7
 3rd Road race, National Road Championships
2015
 1st Stage 4 Bałtyk–Karkonosze Tour
 3rd Minsk Cup
 9th Overall Dookoła Mazowsza
2016
 1st Grand Prix of ISD
 2nd Grand Prix of Vinnytsia
 5th Race Horizon Park Classic
 8th Overall Tour of Ukraine

References

External links

1992 births
Living people
Kazakhstani male cyclists
People from Taraz